This is a list of public art in Douala ( second largest city in Cameroon ), within the city and its adjacent municipalities, including statues, sculptures, murals and other significant artworks located outside in public view.

Sites

Permanent artwork

Temporary or disappeared artworks

References

Bibliography
 Pensa, Iolanda (Ed.) 2017. Public Art in Africa. Art et transformations urbaines à Douala /// Art and Urban Transformations in Douala. Genève: Metis Presses. 
 Marta Pucciarelli (2014) Final Report. University of Applied Sciences and Arts of Southern Switzerland, Laboratory of visual culture. 

Public art
Public art in Douala
Douala
Buildings and structures in Douala